Kerio or Kerío may be:

Places
 Keri, Greece, a town in Greece, is also known as Kerío
 The Kerio River, in northern Kenya
 Kerio Valley, in Kenya 
 Marakwet East Constituency, an electoral constituency in Kenya, formerly Kerio East Constituency
 Kério, a hamlet in Brittany

Other
 Chiloglanis sp. nov. 'Kerio' is a species of fish in the family Mochokidae
 Kerio Technologies, an American software company

See also
 Kerið, a volcanic crater lake in Iceland
 Elgeyo, Keiyo or Kerio, an ethnic group of the Keiyo District, Kenya
 Keiyo District, a former administrative district in the Rift Valley Province of Kenya